is a train station in Miyazaki City, Miyazaki Prefecture, Japan.

Lines

Layout 
The station consists of a side platform serving a single track at grade. The station building is a simple open-concept structure that serves mainly as a weather shelter for passengers on the platform. A ticket window has been built but is not staffed. From the station entrance, a pedestrian bridge leads across the main road to the Miyazaki Sports Park, the facility which gives its name to the station.

Adjacent stations

History
Japanese National Railways (JNR) opened the station on 18 March 1984 as a temporary stop on the existing track of the Nichinan Line. With the privatization of JNR on 1 April 1987, JR Kyushu assumed control of Undōkōen  and upgraded it to a full station.

Passenger statistics
In fiscal 2016, the station was used by an average of 31 passengers (boarding only) per day.

Surrounding area
Sun Marine Stadium

See also
List of railway stations in Japan

References

External links
Undōkōen (JR Kyushu)

Railway stations in Japan opened in 1984
Railway stations in Miyazaki Prefecture
Miyazaki (city)